Rock Me Gently may refer to:
"Rock Me Gently" (Andy Kim song)
"Rock Me Gently" (Erasure song)